may refer to:
 Keikyū Haneda Airport Station (1956–1991), now Tenkūbashi Station
 Tokyo Monorail Haneda Airport Station (1993–2004), now Haneda Airport Terminal 1 Station
 Keikyū Haneda Airport Station (1998–2010), now Haneda Airport Terminal 1·2 Station

See also 
 Haneda Station (disambiguation)
 Haneda Airport Terminal 2 Station
 Haneda Airport Terminal 3 Station